The Ministry of Foreign Affairs and International Relations is a cabinet ministry of Lesotho in charge of conducting and designing the foreign relations of the country.

Organization and structure
The ministry seeks to establish, promote and develop good relations between Lesotho and the International Community for the advancement and enhancement of Lesotho's prosperity and for the protection of its sovereignty, independence and territorial integrity.

The ministry has the following departments: Directorate of Protocol, Directorate of Political Affairs, Africa and the Middle East, Directorate of Europe and the Americas, Directorate of Asia, far East and the Pacific, Directorate of Economic and International Organizations, Directorate of Legal Affairs and Directorate of Consular Affairs.

The current Minister of Foreign Affairs and International Relations is 'Matšepo Ramakoae.

List of ministers
This is a list of Ministers of Foreign Affairs and International Relations of Lesotho:

1966–1972: Leabua Jonathan
1972–1974: Peete Nkuebe Peter Peete
1974–1975: Joseph Kotsokoane
1975–1981: Charles Dube Molapo
1981–1982: Mooki Vitus Molapo
1982–1983: Charles Dube Molapo
1983–1984: Evaristus Sekhonyana
1984–1986: Vincent Montsi Makhele
1986–1988: Lengolo B. Monyake
1988–1990: Thaabe Letsie
1990–1991: Tom Thabane
1991–1992: Pius Tanki Molapo
1992–1993: Tokonye Kotelo
1993–1994: Molapo Qhobela
1994............ Evaristus Sekhonyana
1994–1995: Molapo Qhobela
1995............ Mpho Malie
1995–1998: Kelebone Maope
1998–2002: Tom Thabane
2002–2004: Mohlabi Tsekoa
2004–2007: Monyane Moleleki
2007–2015: Mohlabi Tsekoa
2015–2017: Tlohang Sekhamane
2017–2020: Lesego Makgothi
2020–present: 'Matšepo Ramakoae

See also
List of diplomatic missions of Lesotho
List of diplomatic missions in Lesotho

References

Politics of Lesotho
Political organisations based in Lesotho
Foreign relations of Lesotho
Lesotho
Government of Lesotho